Nikolaj Læsø Dueholm Christensen (born 15 November 1996) is a Danish handball player for FC Porto  and the Danish national team.

He represented Denmark at the 2021 World Men's Handball Championship.

References

1996 births
Living people
Danish male handball players
Sportspeople from Aarhus
Aalborg Håndbold players
FC Porto handball players